Leanne M. Redman is a physiologist. She is an LPFA Endowed Fellowship
Professor at the Pennington Biomedical Research Center of the Louisiana State University System, where she studies childhood obesity.
She was lead researcher on a study that found that low-calorie diets decreased the effects of aging. Redman received the 2018 NPA Garnett-Powers & Associates Mentor Award in recognition of support for post-doctorate mentee scholars in her reproductive endocrinology lab.

Education 
Redman did her undergraduate studies in human movement science at Southern Cross University in Australia, earning a bachelor's degree with honors there in 2000. She completed a doctorate at the University of Adelaide in 2004. In 2011 she added a master's degree in clinical research from Tulane University.

References 

Living people
American physiologists
Women physiologists
Tulane University alumni
University of Adelaide alumni
Southern Cross University alumni
Year of birth missing (living people)